Renfield is a fictional character in Bram Stoker's Dracula.

Renfield may also refer to:

 Renfield, a card game
 Renfield, a Peggle master in the video game, Peggle.
 Renfield (film), an American film based on the fictional character